David Ritchie (born 19 April 1935) is a former  Australian rules footballer who played with Hawthorn in the Victorian Football League (VFL).

Notes

External links 

1935 births
Living people
Australian rules footballers from Victoria (Australia)
Hawthorn Football Club players